Colette Marie Claudette Brosset (21 February 1922 – 1 March 2007) was a French actress, writer and choreographer.

She was once married to actor Robert Dhéry, with whom she appeared onstage in La Plume de Ma Tante and Ah! Les belles bacchantes.

She appeared on Broadway in 1959 in La Plume de Ma Tante, and was, along with the rest of the entire cast (Pamela Austin,  Roger Caccia, Yvonne Constant, Genevieve Coulombel, Robert Dhéry, Michael Kent, Jean Lefevre, Jacques Legras, Michael Modo, Pierre Olaf, Nicole Parent, Ross Parker, Henri Pennec) awarded a Special Tony Award 1959 for contribution to the theatre.

Filmography (as actress)
Un coup de rouge (1937)
Thérèse Martin (1938)
 Star Without Light (1946) - Lulu
Master Love (1946) - Marie
En êtes-vous bien sûr? (1947) - l'employée amoureuse de Coco
Les Aventures des Pieds-Nickelés (1948) - Irène
 I Like Only You (1949) - Monrival
 Branquignol (1949)- Caroline
 Bernard and the Lion (1951) - Anne
Love Is Not a Sin (1952) - Eliane Cahuzac
Ah! Les belles bacchantes (1954) - Colette Brosset
La Belle Américaine (1961) - Paulette Perrignon
Allez France! (1964) - Lady Yvette Brisburn 'Vévette'
La Communale (1965) - L'institutrice
Is Paris Burning? (1966) - (uncredited)
La Grande Vadrouille (1966) - Germaine
The Little Bather (1968) - Charlotte Castagnier
Trois hommes sur un cheval (1969) - Moll / Kiki
A Time for Loving (1972, TV Movie)
Vos gueules les mouettes! (1974) - Annick Kenavec
Jack, or The Submission (1977)
Qui c'est ce garçon? (1987, TV miniseries) - La grand-mère
Série noire (1988, TV Series) - Le manteau de Saint Martin (final appearance)

References
Colette Brosset. CinéArtistes.com

External links

1922 births
2007 deaths
French women choreographers
French film actresses
French women screenwriters
20th-century French screenwriters
French stage actresses
French television actresses
Actresses from Paris
20th-century French actresses
20th-century French women writers
Writers from Paris